Piala Sumbangsih (English: Charity Cup), also known as Piala Sultan Haji Ahmad Shah or Malaysian Charity Shield, is the Malaysian super cup competition. It is the curtain raiser match to the new Malaysian football season, pitting the reigning Malaysia Super League champions against the previous year's winners of the Malaysia Cup.

The 2023 edition was held between the Malaysia Super League champions, Johor Darul Ta'zim, and the Malaysia Super League runners-up, Terengganu, with Johor winning their eighth Piala Sumbangsih title after winning the match 2–0.

History 
The Piala Sumbangsih was first held in 1985, contested between Selangor and Pahang, with Selangor becoming the first winner after winning the match 2–1. The cup format has changed when during early days it was contested by the previous year winners of the Malaysia FA Cup against the Malaysia Cup winners, and only in recent years it has changed to be contested between the last year league winners against the Malaysia Cup winners.

The Piala Sumbangsih match act as the curtain raiser match to the new Malaysian football season, pitting the reigning Malaysia Super League champions against the previous year's winners of the Malaysia Cup. Since 2016, the Piala Sumbangsih match is also considered the first match of the league season, where the league points are awarded.

Winners

Most successful teams

See also 
 Malaysia Super League
 Malaysia Cup
 Malaysia FA Cup
 Piala Emas Raja-Raja

References 

 
National association football supercups
Football cup competitions in Malaysia